"Girl Loves Me" is a song by English musician David Bowie. It is the fifth track on Bowie's twenty-sixth and final studio album, Blackstar, released on 8 January 2016. The track was written by Bowie and produced by Bowie and Tony Visconti. "Girl Loves Me" peaked at number 87 on the Dutch Top 100 and number 146 on the UK Singles Chart.

Composition
"Girl Loves Me" is notable for its usage of Polari and Nadsat in its lyrics, the latter of which is a fictional slang created by Anthony Burgess which was used very often in his 1962 novel A Clockwork Orange.
The song also includes a reference to the Chestnut Tree, a bar in the final part of the dystopian novel 1984 by George Orwell. This is partly used because the Chestnut Tree is a place in the novel where the protagonist goes to find he no longer feels emotions for his love, and this song's lyrics have obvious references to love, hence the title.

Critical reception
Rolling Stone calls "Girl Loves Me" their favorite moment from Blackstar, labeling it as "dark, trippy and sexy in ways only the late, great icon could pull off." NME labels the song as a "menacing, militaristic tattoo," and suggests that Bowie was possibly influenced by rappers Future and Young Thug on the song.

Charts

References

2016 songs
David Bowie songs
Macaronic songs
A Clockwork Orange